Paul James De Meo (June 4, 1953 – February 26, 2018) was an American screenwriter and producer for film, television and video games. He frequently worked with Danny Bilson. Together, they wrote Eliminators (1986), The Rocketeer (1991), the video game James Bond 007: Everything or Nothing (2003), the television series Viper (1994, 1996), The Sentinel (1996), and both the television and comic book series of The Flash (1990). Da 5 Bloods (2020), based on a screenplay written by De Meo and Bilson, was released posthumously. He wrote two comics based on the Red Faction series: Armegeddon and Red Faction: Guerrilla: A Fire On Mars produced by Wildstorm Comics.

Career
De Meo graduated from California State University, San Bernardino.  There he met and teamed up with long-time writing partner Bilson, and together they formed Pet Fly Productions.

Bilson and DeMeo produced their first script, Trancers (1985), a noir tale about a time-travelling detective from the future. Five sequels were made. After, they did two comedies, Zone Troopers (1985) and The Wrong Guys (1988). Next, they undertook the adaptation of The Rocketeer in 1985. Writing for Disney, the partners were hired and fired several times during the five years of movie development.

Creator Dave Stevens liked that "their ideas for The Rocketeer were heartfelt and affectionate tributes to the 1930s serials with all the right dialogue and atmosphere. Most people would approach my characters contemporarily, but Danny and Paul saw them as pre-war mugs." that same year, the trio approached William Dear to direct/co-write The Rocketeer, and they eventually dropped the low-budget idea. Bilson, De Meo, and Dear kept the comic book's basic plot intact, but fleshed it out to include a Hollywood setting and a climactic battle against a Nazi Zeppelin. They also tweaked Cliff's girlfriend to avoid comparisons to Bettie Page (Stevens' original inspiration), changing her name from Betty to Jenny and her profession from nude model to Hollywood extra (a change also made to make the film more family friendly). The two had a rough executive experience, in which scenes were deleted only to be restored years later. The film finally made it to theaters in 1991, where it underperformed at the box office but developed a cult following.

DeMeo would spend the rest of the 1990s working in television, creating programmes like Human Target, and would transition into video games in the 2000s, working on several James Bond games. He later wrote both the film adaptation and video game sequel to Company of Heroes.

The Flash and Red Menace
Bilson and De Meo returned to writing comics, co-writing The Flash: The Fastest Man Alive for DC Comics in 2006. They also wrote a mini-series for Wildstorm Comics named Red Menace with actor Adam Brody (who was dating Bilson's daughter Rachel Bilson at the time).

Death
De Meo died on February 26, 2018. Bilson was the first to report it on Twitter. His last screenplay, the Vietnam War drama Da 5 Bloods, was made into a film, posthumously, in 2020 by Spike Lee and released by Netflix.

Following DeMeo's passing, Danny Bilson would interview with Paul's nephew, Rick Glassman, on the podcast, Take Your Shoes Off. He discussed Paul's death, shared personal stories, and talked about the screenplay developed during Paul's illness for Spike Lee's film, Da Five Bloods.

In 2021, Danny Bilson discussed his career working with DeMeo on The Ghost of Hollywood.

Writing Credits

Award nominations
 The Rocketeer nominated for Best Dramatic Presentation, Hugo Awards 1991.
 Rocketeer Adventure Magazine No. 1 nominated for Best Story or Single Issue, .

References

External links

 Danny Bilson and Paul DeMeo interview by DVD Verdict
 
 Facebook - Pet Fly Productions

1953 births
2018 deaths
American male screenwriters
American comics writers
American film producers
American television producers
American video game designers
California State University, San Bernardino alumni